James Mitchell Kerr (12 May 1910 – 3 January 1998) was a Scottish international rugby and cricket player.

Career
He also played for Heriot's RFC.

See also
 List of Scottish cricket and rugby union players

References

 
 
 

1910 births
1998 deaths
Scottish rugby union players
Scotland international rugby union players
Heriot's RC players
Rugby union players from Edinburgh
Rugby union fullbacks